Anna or Anna the Prophetess is a woman mentioned in the Gospel of Luke. According to that Gospel, she was an elderly woman of the Tribe of Asher who prophesied about Jesus at the Temple of Jerusalem. She appears in  during the presentation of Jesus at the Temple.

New Testament
The passage mentioning Anna is as follows:

From these three verses in Luke, the following is known of Anna:
She was a prophetess.
She was a daughter of Phanuel.
She was a member of the tribe of Asher.
She was widowed after seven years of marriage (her husband is not named).
She was a devout Asherite Hebrew who regularly practiced prayer and fasting.

Luke describes Anna as "very old". Many Bibles and older commentaries state that she was 84 years old.

The Greek text states καὶ αὐτὴ χήρα ὡς ἐτῶν ὀγδοηκοντατεσσάρων, generally translated as "she was a widow of eighty four years". The passage is ambiguous: it could mean that she was 84 years old, or that she had been a widow for 84 years. Some scholars consider the latter to be the more likely option. On this option, she could not have married younger than about age 14, and so she would have been at least 14 + 7 + 84 = 105 years old.

Church traditions and veneration 
The Catholic Church and Eastern Orthodox Church commemorate Anna as a saint, Anna the Prophetess. The Eastern Orthodox Church considers Anna and Simeon the God-Receiver as the last prophets of Old Testament and observes their feast on February 3/February 16 as the synaxis (afterfeast) following the Presentation of Christ, which Orthodox tradition calls "The Meeting of Our Lord and God and Savior, Jesus Christ". Along with Simeon, the prophetess Anna is commemorated on February 3 in the Byzantine rite of the Catholic Church.

Also her figure is drawn in the icons of the Presentation of Christ, together with the Holy Child and the Virgin Mary, Joseph and Simeon the God-Receiver. Orthodox tradition considers that Christ met his people, Israel, in the persons of those two, Simeon and Anna.

References

External links

 
 

1st-century BC Christian saints
Gospel of Luke
People in the canonical gospels
Prophets of the New Testament
Christian saints from the New Testament
Women in the New Testament
1st-century BCE Jews
Ante-Nicene Christian female saints